Kadhal Rojavae is a 2000 Indian Tamil-language romance film directed by Keyaar, which was a remake of the 1991 Hindi film Dil Hai Ke Manta Nahin  by Mahesh Bhatt. The film stars newcomers George Vishnu and Pooja Kumar, while Sarath Babu, Charle and S. S. Chandran play supporting roles. The film's music is composed by Ilaiyaraaja.

Cast

George Vishnu as Vishnu
Pooja Kumar as Pooja
Sarath Babu as Sarath
S. S. Chandran as Dixon
Charle as Nixon
Alex as Gang leader
Suryakanth as Henchman
O. A. K. Sundar as Henchman
Sujith Sagar as Arun
Thyagu as Sadasivam
Loose Mohan as Bus conductor
R. S. Shivaji as Mechanic
Madhan Bob as Hotel manager
S. N. Vasanth as Vishnu's friend
Balu Anand as Van driver
Vengal Rao as Henchman
Keyaar as Himself (cameo appearance)
M. Bhaskar as Himself (cameo appearance)
Ramki in a special appearance

Production
Keyaar had planned to make the film with Prashanth during 1996, but the actor's commitments to Shankar's Jeans (1998), meant that he could not allot dates to start the project. Consequently, Bhaskar of Oscar Movies signed George Vishnu, the son of former actress Sheela to debut in his production, Kadhal Rojavae in 1997 and according to the deal signed, Vishnu was not supposed to act in any other film until Kadhal Rojavae had been completed and released. However, during production, Vishnu could not wait and starred in a Malayalam film, while Keyaar was still shooting causing a rift between the actor and producer Bhaskar during the making of the project. Pooja Kumar, who was crowned Miss India USA in 1995, was selected to make her debut as heroine and during production she was signed and dropped from other Tamil films of the period including V. I. P and Chinna Raja. The actress notably returned more than a decade later starring in the lead role in Kamal Haasan's bilingual Vishwaroopam. Kadhal Rojavae released after a delay in production in 2000.

Soundtrack 
The film score and the soundtrack were composed by Ilaiyaraaja. The soundtrack features 10 tracks with lyrics written by Vaali, Muthulingam and Vaasan. The audio cassette was launched at a ceremony in Chennai, with A. V. M. Saravanan and Sivakumar presiding over the event as chief guests during early 1997.

Release
The film opened in January 2000 to mixed reviews with Savitha of The Hindu mentioning "Both the newcomers have a long way to go in honing their acting skills". The critic also added that "the high point of the film is the music by Ilaiyaraja. The same can be said about the background score that lifts the mood of the film to some extent."

References

External links 

2000 films
Films scored by Ilaiyaraaja
2000s Tamil-language films
Tamil remakes of Hindi films
Films directed by Keyaar